Karl Ritter von Lobenhoffer (born 1843 – died 1901)  was a Bavarian Lieutenant General and Chief of the General Staff of the Bavarian army from 1896 to 1901.

Von Lobenhoffer was son of Wilhelm Lobenhoffer (died 1862), a royal Bavarian judge. He is buried on the Old Southern Cemetery in Munich.

References and notes

Bavarian generals
People from the Kingdom of Bavaria
1843 births
1901 deaths